Sesa or SESA may refer to:

Companies and organizations 
 Sesa Football Academy, a football club of Goa, India
 Sesa Goa, a mining company of India
 , see Antoine Sabarthès (publisher)
 Société d'Etudes des Systèmes d'Automation, a company that manufactured X.25 switches, see Rémi Després
 Society for Experimental Stress Analysis, original name of the Society for Experimental Mechanics
 Swiss Accident Investigation Board (Service denquête suisse sur les accidents)

Other uses
 Sesa, Spain, a municipality in Aragon
 Sesa language, a language of Papua New Guinea
 Sesa river, a tributary of the Gambhir River, Rajasthan, India
 David Sesa (born 1973), Swiss footballer
 General Ulpiano Paez Airport (ICAO: SESA)
 Shesha (Sanskrit: Śeṣa), a serpent in Hindu mythology
 Standard Encyclopaedia of Southern Africa, published 1971–1976

See also